The following is a list of New Zealand politicians, both past and present. The scope is quite broad, including prominent candidates for local and central government office as well as those who achieved such office.



A
Ahipene-Mercer, Ray local politician
Adams, Amy Cabinet Minister 
Algie, Sir Ronald Speaker of the House (1961–1966)
Allen, Alfred Speaker of the House (1972)
Allen, Lettie local politician
Allen, Sir James Cabinet Minister (1911–1920)
Ambler, Fred local politician
Amos, Phil Cabinet Minister 
Andersen, Ginny Member of Parliament
Anderton, Bill Cabinet Minister 
Anderton, Jim Deputy Prime Minister (1999–2002)
Appleton, Sir William Mayor of Wellington
Archer, John Mayor of Christchurch
Ardern, Jacinda Prime Minister (2017–present)
Arthur, Sir Basil Speaker of the House (1984–1985)
Armishaw, Eric local politician
Atkinson, Arthur (Jr.)
Atkinson, Harry Premier of New Zealand (1876–1877)
Atmore, Harry Cabinet Minister (1928–1931)
Auchinvole, Chris  Member of Parliament (2008–2014)
Awatere Huata, Donna  Member of Parliament (1996–2004)
Ayrton, Moses local politician

B
Bacot, John
Baldock, Larry
Ballance, John – Prime Minister
Banks, John Mayor of Auckland
Barber, William Henry Peter Member of Parliament
Barker, Rick Cabinet Minister 
Barnard, Bill – Speaker (1936–1943)
Bartram, Fred Member of Parliament
Bassett, Michael Cabinet Minister 
Basten, Alice local politician
Bateman, Jim local politician
Batten, Ann Member of Parliament
Baume, Frederick Member of Parliament
Bedford, Harry Member of Parliament
Beetham, Bruce Member of Parliament
Belich, Sir James Mayor of Wellington
Benson-Pope, David Cabinet Minister 
Bell, Dillon Member of Parliament
Bell, Francis – Prime Minister
Beyer, Georgina Member of Parliament
Birch, Bill Cabinet Minister
Black, George Member of Parliament
Blincoe, John Member of Parliament
Bloodworth, Thomas local politician
Bolger, Jim – Prime Minister (1990–1997)
Bond, Ria Member of Parliament
Blumsky, Mark Mayor of Wellington
Bracken, Thomas
Bradford, Sue Member of Parliament
Brash, Don Leader of the Opposition
Brash, Jenny Mayor of Porirua
Brindle, Tom local politician
Brown, Peter Member of Parliament
Brown, Vigor Mayor of Napier
Brownlee, Gerry Cabinet Minister 
Brunt, Tony local politician
Buck, Vicki Mayor of Christchurch
Buckley, Patrick
Burke, John Mayor of Porirua
Burke, Kerry Speaker of the House
Burton, Mark Cabinet Minister 
Butler, Peter local politician
Buttle, Keith  Mayor of Auckland

C
Carleton, Hugh MP (1853–1870)
Robert Holt Carpenter (1820-1891), local politician
Carr, Clyde Member of Parliament
Carr, Peter Member of Parliament
Carroll, Sir James  Member of Parliament (1887–1919)
Carter, Chris Cabinet Minister (2002–2007)
Casey, Cathy
Caygill, David Cabinet Minister (1984–1990)
Chapman, Charles Henry Member of Parliament
Chapman, Val local politician
Choudhary, Dr. Ashraf  Member of Parliament (2002–2011)
Churchill, John local politician
Clark, David Cabinet Minister 
Clark, Helen Prime Minister (1999–2008)
Clifford, Sir Charles Speaker of the House (1853–1860)
Coates, Gordon Prime Minister (1925–1928)
Coffey, Tāmati Member of Parliament
Collins, Efeso local politician
Coleman, David Member of Parliament
Cooke, Frederick local politician
Cooper, Warren Cabinet Minister (1978–1984, 1990–1996)
Copeland, Gordon  Member of Parliament (2002–2008)
Croskery, Alexander local politician
Courtney, Mel  Member of Parliament (1976–1981)
Cox, Edwin Thoms Mayor of Dunedin
Cracknell, Vernon Member of Parliament
Craig, Liz Member of Parliament
Creech, Wyatt Deputy Prime Minister (1998–1999), Cabinet Minister (1990–1999)
Cullen, Sir Michael Cabinet Minister (1999–2008)
Cumberland, Ken local politician
Cunliffe, David Cabinet Minister (2002–2008)
Curran, Clare Cabinet Minister 
Curran, Pat local politician

D
Dalziel, Lianne Mayor of Christchurch
Davidson, Marama Member of Parliament
Davies, Sonja Member of Parliament
Davis, George local politician
Davis, Kelvin Cabinet Minister 
de Ruyter, Stephnie local politician
Delamere, Tuariki Member of Parliament
Dockrill, Edward Mayor of New Plymouth
Doidge, Frederick Cabinet Minister 
Domett, Alfred - Prime Minister
Donald, Rod Member of Parliament
Douglas, Norman Member of Parliament
Douglas, Sir Roger Douglas – Minister of Finance
Dowse, Percy Mayor of Lower Hutt
Dreaver, Mary Member of Parliament
Dunne, Peter Cabinet Minister 
Dwyer, Jeremy Mayor of Hastings
Dyson, Ruth Cabinet Minister

E
East, Paul Cabinet Minister
Eagle, Paul Member of Parliament
Edwards, Clive local politician
English, Bill Prime Minister (2016–2017)
Entrican, Andrew local politician
Ewen-Street, Ian Member of Parliament

F
Faafoi, Kris Cabinet Minister
Fagan, Mark  Speaker of the Legislative Council
Featherston, Isaac
Fisher, Francis
Fitzherbert, William
Fitzsimons, Jeanette Member of Parliament
Fletcher, Robert Member of Parliament
Forsaith, Thomas
Forsyth, Thomas Member of Parliament
Fortuin, Gregory
Fortune, Wilfred Member of Parliament
Foster, Andy local politician
Fowlds, George Cabinet Minister
Fowler, Sir Michael Mayor of Wellington
Fletcher, Christine Mayor of Auckland
Forbes, George – Prime Minister
Fox, William – Prime Minister
Fox, Marama Member of Parliament
Flavell, Te Ururoa Cabinet Minister
Franks, Stephen Member of Parliament
Fraser, Francis Humphris
Fraser, Peter – Prime Minister
Fraser, Bill Cabinet Minister
Fraser, Dame Dorothy local politician
Freer, Warren Cabinet Minister
Furkert, Frederick local politician

G
Gair, George Cabinet Minister
Gaskin, Ida
Genter, Julie Anne Cabinet Minister
Gilmer, Dame Elizabeth local politician
Glasse, Fred local politician
Gledhill, Francis
Glover, Albert Member of Parliament
Glover, John local politician
Goff, Phil Mayor of Auckland
Goodman, Dame Barbara local politician
Gordon, Liz Member of Parliament
Gosche, Mark Cabinet Minister
Gotlieb, Ruth local politician
Graham, Doug Cabinet Minister
Gray, John
Gray, Robin Speaker of the House
Greenwood, Joseph
Grey, Sir George- Prime Minister and twice Governor
Guinness, Arthur Speaker of the House

H
Hall, Sir John – Prime Minister
Hall-Jones, Sir William – Prime Minister
Hamilton, Adam Leader of the Opposition
Hancock, Hamish Member of Parliament
Harawira, Hone – Leader of Mana Party
Harré, Laila Cabinet Minister
Harrison, Sir Richard
Hart, Robert
Harvey, Bob Mayor of Waitakere
Hawkins, George Cabinet Minister
Henare, Peeni Cabinet Minister
Henare, Tau Cabinet Minister
Hickey, Pat
Hide, Rodney Cabinet Minister
Highet, Allan Cabinet Minister
Hill, Edward Mayor of New Plymouth
Hill, Henry Mayor of Napier
Hipkins, Chris Cabinet Minister
Hindmarsh, Alfred Member of Parliament
Hobbs, Marian Cabinet Minister
Hodgson, Pete Cabinet Minister
Holland, Harry Leader of the Opposition
Holland, Sir Sidney – Prime Minister
Holyoake, Sir Keith – Prime Minister and Governor-General
Horomia, Parekura Cabinet Minister
Howard, Mabel – New Zealand's first female Cabinet Minister
Hudson, Wally Member of Parliament
Hunt, Jonathan Speaker of the House
Hunter, Edward
Hunter, Hiram local politician

I
Izard, Charles Hayward Member of Parliament

J
Jack, Roy Speaker of the House
Jackson, Willie Cabinet Minister
Jeffries, Bill Cabinet Minister
Jeffries, John local politician
Jones, Bob
Jones, Dail Member of Parliament
Jones, Fred Cabinet Minister
Jones, Shane Cabinet Minister

K
Kanongata'a-Suisuiki, Anahila Member of Parliament
Kealy, John W. local politician
Kedgley, Sue Member of Parliament
Kelham, James
Key, John – Prime Minister (2008–2016)
Kidd, Doug Cabinet Minister
King, Annette Cabinet Minister
King, Thomas
Kinsella, Arthur QSO – Cabinet Minister (1960–1969)
Kirk, Norman – Prime Minister
Kirton, Neil Cabinet Minister
Kitts, Sir Frank Mayor of Wellington
Knapp, Gary Member of Parliament
Kopu, Alamein Member of Parliament

L
Laidlaw, Chris Member of Parliament
Lake, Harry Cabinet Minister
Lang, Frederic Speaker of the House
Lange, David – Prime Minister
Langstone, Frank Cabinet Minister
Larnach, William  Member of Parliament
Laurenson, George Cabinet Minister
Laws, Michael Member of Parliament
Leadbeater, Maire local politician
Lee, Graeme Cabinet Minister
Lee, John A.  Member of Parliament
Lee-Vercoe, Sandra Cabinet Minister
Lee, Walter Cabinet Minister
Lees-Galloway, Iain Cabinet Minister
Leggett, Nick Mayor of Porirua
Lester, Justin Mayor of Wellington
Lewis, Richard
Little, Andrew Cabinet Minister
Locke, Keith Member of Parliament
Logie, Jan Member of Parliament
Love, Ralph Mayor of Petone
Lubeck, Marja Member of Parliament
Luxton, Jo Member of Parliament
Luxton, John Cabinet Minister

M
Macandrew, James Cabinet Minister
Macdonald, Kennedy Member of Parliament
Macdonald, Tom Cabinet Minister
Macfarlane, Sir Robert Speaker of the House
MacIntyre, Duncan Deputy Prime Minister
Mackay, James
Mackenzie, Thomas - Prime Minister
Mackey, Janet Member of Parliament
Mackley, Garnet Member of Parliament
McAnulty, Kieran Member of Parliament
McCarten, Matt
McCombs, Elizabeth – New Zealand's first female Member of Parliament
McCombs, James Member of Parliament
McCombs, Sir Terry Cabinet Minister
McCulloch, Alan
McDavitt, Terry local politician
McDouall, Hamish Mayor of Wanganui
McGrath, Denis local politician
McKeen, Robert Speaker of the House
McKinnon, Don –  Deputy Prime Minister, Secretary General of the Commonwealth
McKinnon, Ian local politician
McLay, Sir Jim Deputy Prime Minister
McLaren, David Mayor of Wellington
McManus, John local politician
McMillan, Ethel Member of Parliament
McMillan, Gervan Cabinet Minister
McQueen, Ewen
McVicar, Annie local politician
Maguire, Emily local politician
Maharey, Steve Cabinet Minister
Mallard, Trevor Speaker of the House
Mahuta, Nanaia Cabinet Minister
Manning, George Mayor of Christchurch
Mark, Ron Cabinet Minister
Marks, Roly local politician
Marshall, Jack – Prime Minister
Marshall, Russell Cabinet Minister
Martin, Bernard
Martin, Tracey Cabinet Minister
Massey, William – Prime Minister
Matthews, Pressley Hemingway
Matthewson, Clive Cabinet Minister
Mason, Rex – Longest serving Member of Parliament
Melville, Ellen local politician
Merriman, Frederick
Meurant, Ross Member of Parliament
Mihaka, Dun
Minogue, Mike Member of Parliament
Monro, David
Monteith, Alex Member of Parliament
Moore, Frank
Garry Moore Mayor of Christchirch
Moore, Mike – Prime Minister and Director-General of the World Trade Organization
Moorhouse, William Sefton Member of Parliament
Morgan, Tuku Member of Parliament
Morris, Deborah Member of Parliament
Morrison, Gordon local politician
Morrison, John local politician
Morrison, Neil Member of Parliament
Moyle, Colin Cabinet Minister
Muldoon, Sir Robert – Prime Minister (1975–1984)
Munro, Jim Member of Parliament

N
Nash, Stuart Cabinet Minister
Nash, Sir Walter – Prime Minister (1957–1960)
Neale, Edgar Rollo (Gar)  Member of Parliament (1946–1957)
Neilson, Peter  Member of Parliament
Neilson, Peter Cabinet Minister
Newman, Alfred Mayor of Wellington
Newman, Muriel Member of Parliament
Ngata, Āpirana Cabinet Minister
Noonan, Rosslyn local politician
Nordmeyer, Sir Arnold – Minister of Finance
Northey, Richard Member of Parliament
Nosworthy, William Cabinet Minister

O
Oram, Matthew Speaker of the House
O'Brien, Gerald Member of Parliament
O'Brien, Loughlin
O'Connor, Damien Cabinet Minister
O'Connor, Greg Member of Parliament
O'Flynn, Frank Cabinet Minister
O'Neill, James
O'Rorke, Maurice was O'Rorke, George - Speaker of the House
O'Rourke, Denis Member of Parliament
Okeroa, Mahara Member of Parliament

P
Palmer, Geoffrey – Prime Minister
Parata, Hekia Cabinet Minister
Parker, David Cabinet Minister
Parry, Bill Cabinet Minister
Paul, Tom
Payne, John Member of Parliament
Peck, Mark Member of Parliament
Peters, Winston Deputy Prime Minister  
Phelan, Ted local politician
Pollen, Daniel – Prime Minister
Pomare, Sir Maui  Member of Parliament
Power, Simon Cabinet Minister
Prebble, Richard Cabinet Minister
Prime, Willow-Jean Member of Parliament

Q
Quick, William Henry
Quigley, Derek Cabinet Minister

R
Radhakrishnan, Priyanca Member of Parliament
Rata, Matiu Member of Parliament
Ratana, Matiu Member of Parliament
Rainbow, Stephen local politician
Read, John local politician
Reeves, William Pember – MP
Revans, Samuel
Rich, Katherine Member of Parliament
Richardson, Ruth Cabinet Minister
Rigg, John
Ritchie, Helene local politician
Roberts, James local politician
Robertson, Grant Cabinet Minister
Robertson, John Member of Parliament
Robinson, David Member of Parliament
Robinson, Sir Dove-Meyer Mayor of Auckland
Robson, Matt Member of Parliament
Ross, Hilda Cabinet Minister
Rosser, Arthur local politician
Rowling, Sir Wallace (Bill) – Prime Minister
Russell, Deborah Member of Parliament
Ryall, Tony Cabinet Minister

S
Sage, Eugenie Cabinet Minister
Salesa, Jenny Cabinet Minister
Salmond, John
Savage, Michael Joseph – Prime Minister
Sayegh, Joe local politician
Scott, William John (Jack) – Former Cabinet Minister (1963–1969)
Seddon, Richard – Prime Minister
Semple, Bob Cabinet Minister
Semple, Margaret local politician
Sepuloni, Carmel Cabinet Minister
Seymour, David Member of Parliament
Sewell, Henry – Prime Minister
Schramm, Bill Speaker of the House
Shadbolt, Tim Mayor of Invercargill
Shand, David local politician
Shaw, James – Prime Minister
Shearer, David Leader of the Opposition
Sheat, William Member of Parliament
Shelton, Norman – Former Cabinet Minister (1960–1962)
Shipley, Dame Jenny – New Zealand's first female Prime Minister (1997–1999)
Shirley, Ken Member of Parliament
Sinclair, Suzanne Member of Parliament
Skinner, Jerry Deputy Prime Minister
Smith, Lockwood Speaker of the House
Smith, Nick – Prime Minister
Smuts-Kennedy, Olive local politician
Sowry, Roger – Prime Minister
Spry, Keith local politician
Stafford, Edward – Prime Minister
Statham, Sir Charles – Speaker of the House (1923–1935)
Stewart, John Member of Parliament
Steward, William Member of Parliament
Stewart, William Downie Sr
Stewart, William Downie Jr Cabinet Minister
Stout, Sir Robert – Premier
Strange, Jamie Member of Parliament
Sullivan, Dan Cabinet Minister
Sullivan, Whetu Tirikatene Member of Parliament
Sutton, Jim Cabinet Minister
Swain, Paul Cabinet Minister

T
Tabuteau, Fletcher Member of Parliament
Tánczos, Nándor Member of Parliament
Talboys, Brian Deputy Prime Minister
Tamihere, John Cabinet Minister
Tanner, William
Tapsell, Peter – Speaker of the House
Tawhai, Hone Mohi
Taylor, Tommy Mayor of Christchurch
Tennet, Elizabeth Member of Parliament
Te Heuheu, Georgina Cabinet Minister
Thorn, Jim Member of Parliament
Thorn, Margaret local politician
Tinetti, Jan Member of Parliament
Tizard, Bob Deputy Prime Minister
Tizard, Catherine Mayor of Auckland
Tizard, Judith Cabinet Minister
Toop, Ernest local politician
Tregear, Edward local politician
Trevethick, Jonathan local politician
Turei, Metiria Member of Parliament
Turia, Tariana Cabinet Minister
Turner, Sukhi Mayor of Dunedin
Twyford, Phil Cabinet Minister

U
Upton, Simon Cabinet Minister

V
Veitch, Bill Cabinet Minister
Vinnell, Percy local politician
Vogel, Sir Julius – Prime Minister

W
Wade-Brown, Celia Mayor of Wellington
Wall, Gerard Speaker of the House
Wakefield, Edward Gibbon
Wakefield, Jerningham
Waring, Marilyn Member of Parliament
Ward, Sir Joseph – Prime Minister
Ward, Mike Member of Parliament
Warren-Clark, Angie Member of Parliament
Waterhouse, George – Prime Minister
Watt, Hugh Deputy Prime Minister
Webb, Duncan Member of Parliament
Webb, Paddy Cabinet Minister
Weld, Frederick – Prime Minister
Whaitiri, Meka Cabinet Minister
Whitaker, Frederick – Prime Minister
Whitehead, Stanley Speaker of the House
Wilde, Dame Fran Mayor of Wellington
Williams, Morgan Member of Parliament
Williamson, Maurice Cabinet Minister
Wilson, Margaret Speaker of the House
Wong, Pansy Cabinet Minister
Wood, Michael Member of Parliament
Woods, Megan Cabinet Minister
Worth, Richard Cabinet Minister
Wright, John Member of Parliament
Wright, Robert Mayor of Wellington

Y
Young, Venn Member of Parliament
Young, Jonathan Member of Parliament

See also
Lists of New Zealanders
List of governors-general of New Zealand
List of prime ministers of New Zealand

Politicians
 
New Zealand
Lists of New Zealand politicians